Yakamuru is a village in Thotlavalluru mandal Krishna district of the Indian state of Andhra Pradesh.

See also
Villages in Thotlavalluru mandal

References

Villages in Krishna district